Vollack is a surname. Notable people with the surname include:

Anthony Vollack (1929–2015), American judge
Lia Vollack (born 1965), American record executive